Suseni is a commune in Harghita County, Romania. It lies in the Székely Land, an ethno-cultural region in eastern Transylvania.

Component villages 
The commune is composed of five villages:

History 
The villages were part of the Székely Land region of the historical Transylvania region. They belonged to Gyergyószék area until the administrative reform of Transylvania in 1876, when they fell within the Gyergyószentmiklós district of Csík County in the Kingdom of Hungary. Between 1762 and 1851, the village provided recruits for the 9th Company of the First Székely Infantry Regiment. After the Treaty of Trianon of 1920, they became part of Romania and fell within  Ciuc County during the interwar period. In 1940, the Second Vienna Award granted the Northern Transylvania to Hungary and the villages were held by Hungary until  the end of 1944. After Soviet occupation, the Romanian administration returned and the commune became officially part of Romania in 1947. Between 1952 and 1960, the commune fell within the Magyar Autonomous Region, between 1960 and 1968 the Mureș-Magyar Autonomous Region. In 1968, the province was abolished, and since then, the commune has been part of Harghita County.

Demographics
The commune has an absolute Székely Hungarian majority. According to the 2002 census it has a population of 5,152 of which 97.44% or 5,020 are Hungarian.

Natives
 Janka Boga
 Francisc Forika
 Bogdan Olarson

References

Székely communities
Communes in Harghita County
Localities in Transylvania